Arthur O. Mockrud (August 23, 1912 – April 29, 1982) was an American lawyer and politician.

Mockrud was born in Westby, Wisconsin. He went to the Westby public schools. Mockrud received his bachelor's degree from the University of Wisconsin and his law degree from the University of Wisconsin Law School. He practiced law in Westby and served as the city attorney for Westby. Mockrud served in the Wisconsin Assembly from 1947 to 1955 and was a Republican.

Notes

External links

1912 births
1982 deaths
People from Westby, Wisconsin
University of Wisconsin–Madison alumni
University of Wisconsin Law School alumni
Wisconsin lawyers
Republican Party members of the Wisconsin State Assembly
20th-century American politicians
20th-century American lawyers